This page lists the winners and nominees for the Billboard Music Award for Top R&B Artist. This category was one of the first created and has been given out since the award's conception in 1990. R. Kelly holds the record for most wins in this category with four.

Winners and nominees
Winners are listed first and highlighted in bold.

1990s

2000s

2010s

2020s

Multiple wins and nominations

Wins

4 wins
 R. Kelly

3 wins
 Usher

2 wins
 50 Cent
 The Weeknd

Nominations

7 nominations
 Chris Brown
 The Weeknd

6 nominations
 R. Kelly
 Rihanna

4 nominations
 Beyoncé
 Usher

3 nominations
 Jay Z
 Alicia Keys
 Khalid

2 nominations
 50 Cent
 Toni Braxton
 Mariah Carey
 Doja Cat
 Janet Jackson
 Bruno Mars
 Monica
 Ne-Yo
 Trey Songz
 Summer Walker
 Pharrell Williams

References

Billboard awards